Sandra Pereira is a Portuguese Communist Party politician who was elected in 2019 as a Member of the European Parliament (MEP) on the Unitary Democratic Coalition list.

On 2 March 2022, she was one of 13 MEPs who voted against condemning the 2022 Russian invasion of Ukraine. 

On 15 September 2022, she was one of 16 MEPs who voted against condemning President Daniel Ortega of Nicaragua for human rights violations, in particular the arrest of Bishop Rolando Álvarez.

References

Year of birth missing (living people)
Living people
MEPs for Portugal 2019–2024
21st-century women MEPs for Portugal
Portuguese Communist Party MEPs